Uroš Brežan (born 12 April 1972 in Ljubljana) is a Slovenian economist and politician. He serves as the minister of environment and space of the Republic of Slovenia since 2022.

Education

In 1991, Brežan graduated from the Tolmin High School and continued his education at the Faculty of Economics in Ljubljana. In 2001, he graduated from the aforementioned faculty with the thesis The Meaning of Marketing Posočje as a Tourist Destination.

Career

Even before graduating, Brežan was employed as the head of the information office in the Student Organization of Ljubljana. In 2001, he then got a job at the company M Servis, where he worked until 2004. A year after that, he got a job at the Poso development center where he worked as a project manager.

Mayor of Tolmin municipality

In 2006, he ran for mayor of Tolmin municipality for the first time and was elected to the position with 68% of all votes. In 2010, he ran again and voters again expressed their support for him with 70% of the vote. He was elected twice more, in 2014 and lastly in 2018. On 2 June 2022, he handed over his duties to the deputy mayor, Maša Klavora, due to his new position.

Minister of Environment and Space

From 1 June 2022, in the 15th Slovenian government under the leadership of Robert Golob, he holds the position of minister of environment and space. At the hearing, which he successfully passed on 31 May 2022, he highlighted the responsible use of natural resources and the establishment of dialogue.

References

1972 births
Living people
Environment ministers of Slovenia
20th-century Slovenian economists
Slovenian politicians
21st-century Slovenian economists